Requiem is the sixth album by Californian punk rock band Bracket, released on February 7, 2006 on Takeover Records.  The album marks the longest break between the band's studio albums, with over five years separating Requiem and its predecessor, When All Else Fails.

Bracket recorded the album over the course of two years at Trailer Park Studios which was built by drummer Ray Castro, with the help of the other band members, inside an abandoned trailer.  Requiem would be the first album produced entirely by the band, with vocalist/guitarist Marty Gregori and guitarist Angelo Celli picking up all engineering, production and mixing credits.

Requiem consists of "Warren's Song, Pt. 10" through "Warren's Song, Pt. 26", however the tracks don't appear in succession.  Despite the similar song titles, the release has been described as the most musically diverse Bracket album to date.  In addition to the pop punk sound the band has become known for, the album features a wide range of instrumentation including acoustic elements and string arrangements, as well as expansive vocal harmonies reminiscent of The Beach Boys scattered throughout.

Track listing
All songs written and composed by Bracket.
"Warren's Song, Pt. 16" – 2:15      
"Warren's Song, Pt. 19" – 2:56      
"Warren's Song, Pt. 14" – 2:08      
"Warren's Song, Pt. 24" – 1:46      
"Warren's Song, Pt. 11" – 3:20      
"Warren's Song, Pt. 23" – 3:16      
"Warren's Song, Pt. 17" – 2:36      
"Warren's Song, Pt. 26" – 3:44      
"Warren's Song, Pt. 18" – 3:07      
"Warren's Song, Pt. 12" – 3:46      
"Warren's Song, Pt. 21" – 3:02      
"Warren's Song, Pt. 20" – 2:20      
"Warren's Song, Pt. 10" – 3:52      
"Warren's Song, Pt. 25" – 2:06      
"Warren's Song, Pt. 15" – 3:01      
"Warren's Song, Pt. 22" – 2:57      
"Warren's Song, Pt. 13" – 3:59

History of Warren's Song
In 1994, Bracket began releasing songs titled after Warren Rake, a friend of the band whose childhood artwork appeared in the liner notes of 924 Forestville St., their debut album which also included the first installment of tracks the band titled after him.  Since then, Bracket has continued to issue albums and EPs that usually included at least one "Warren's Song", each with its own individual number.

Personnel
 Marty Gregori – vocals, guitar, engineer, producer, mixer
 Angelo Celli – guitar, vocals, engineer, producer, mixer
 Zack Charlos – bass, vocals
 Ray Castro – drums, studio construction
 George Chavez – cello on "Warren's Song, Pt. 13"
 Calvin Keaoola – violins on "Warren's Song, Pt. 13"
 Sienna S'Zell – viola on "Warren's Song, Pt. 13"

References 
  [ Allmusic - Bracket biography]
  [ Allmusic - Requiem review]

2006 albums
Bracket (band) albums